Frank Ferrara, Jr. (born November 7, 1975) is a former American football defensive end in the National Football League, playing three years for the New York Giants and Philadelphia Eagles. He played college football at the University of Rhode Island.

Released five times before breaking into the Giants' lineup, Ferrara won recognition during his time in New York for his tenacity and effort.

References

1975 births
Living people
American football defensive ends
Amsterdam Admirals players
New York Giants players
Philadelphia Eagles players
BC Lions players
Canadian football defensive linemen
Sportspeople from Staten Island
Players of American football from New York City
Rhode Island Rams football players
New Dorp High School alumni